On Bullshit is a 2005 book (originally a 1986 essay) by American philosopher Harry G. Frankfurt which presents a theory of bullshit that defines the concept and analyzes the applications of bullshit in the context of communication.  Frankfurt determines that bullshit is speech intended to persuade without regard for truth.  The liar cares about the truth and attempts to hide it; the bullshitter doesn't care if what they say is true or false. Frankfurt's philosophical analysis of bullshit has been analyzed, criticized and adopted by academics since its publication.

History 
Frankfurt originally published the essay "On Bullshit" in the Raritan Quarterly Review journal in 1986. Nineteen years later, the essay was published as the book On Bullshit (2005), which proved popular among lay readers; the book appeared for 27 weeks on The New York Times Best Seller list, and was discussed on the television show The Daily Show With Jon Stewart, as well as in an interview with a representative of the publisher, Princeton University Press. On Bullshit served as the basis for Frankfurt's follow-up book On Truth (2006).

Summary 
Frankfurt is a professional philosopher, trained in analytical philosophy. When asked why he decided to focus on bullshit, he explained:

Respect for the truth and a concern for the truth are among the foundations for civilization. I was for a long time disturbed by the lack of respect for the truth that I observed... bullshit is one of the deformities of these values.

His book On Bullshit addresses his concern and makes a distinction between "bullshitters" and liars. He concludes that bullshitters are more insidious: they are more of a threat against the truth than are liars.

Humbug and bullshit 
Frankfurt begins his work on bullshit by presenting an explanation and examination of Max Black's concept of humbug. Black's essay on humbug and Frankfurt's book on bullshit are similar. Both focus on understanding, defining and explaining their respective concepts and using examples. Frankfurt focuses on humbug as he believes it is similar to bullshit but is the more respectful term. Frankfurt uses Black's work on humbug to break down the description of humbug into defining factors: "deceptive misrepresentation", "short of lying” and "misrepresentation... of somebody's own thoughts, feelings, or attitudes." Frankfurt's analysis enables him to distinguish the difference between humbug and lying. The main distinction is the intent that motivates them. The intent behind humbug is misrepresentation, whereas the intent behind lying is more extreme, intending to cover the truth. The comparison of humbug to lying acts as an initial introduction to bullshit. Humbug is closely related to bullshit, but Frankfurt believes it is inadequate to explain bullshit and its characteristics.

Lying and bullshit 
Frankfurt's book focuses heavily on defining and discussing the difference between lying and bullshit. The main difference between the two is intent and deception. Both people who are lying and people who are telling the truth are focused on the truth. The liar wants to steer people away from discovering the truth and the person telling the truth wants to present the truth. The bullshitter differs from both liars and people presenting the truth with their disregard of the truth. Frankfurt explains how bullshitters or people who are bullshitting are distinct as they are not focused on the truth. A person who communicates bullshit is not interested in whether what (s)he says is true or false, only in its suitability for his or her purpose. In his book, Frankfurt defines: shit, bull session and bull. This is done in a lexicographical manner which breaks down the word bullshit and examines each component. The components of the word bullshit highlights the corresponding terms that encompass the overall meaning of the word bullshit: useless, insignificance and nonsense.

Next, Frankfurt focuses on the complete word, and its implications and acceptance. He presents an example of advice provided to a child from his father which encourages choosing bullshit over lying when possible. Frankfurt gives two reasons for the different levels of consequences between bullshit and lying. First, the liar is viewed as being purposefully deceitful or harmful because of the accompanying intent behind the act. Second, the person who bullshits lacks the kind of intention characteristic of the liar. Producing bullshit requires no knowledge of the truth. The liar is intentionally avoiding the truth and the bullshitter may potentially be telling the truth or providing elements of the truth without the intention of doing so. Frankfurt believes bullshitters and the growing acceptance of bullshit is more harmful to society than liars and lying. This is because liars actively consider the truth when they conceal it whereas bullshitters completely disregard the truth. "Bullshit is a greater enemy of the truth than lies are." Frankfurt believes that while bullshit may be tolerated more, it is much more harmful.

Rise of bullshit 
Frankfurt concludes his book by discussing the rise of bullshit. He does not argue that there is more bullshit in society now than there was in the past. He explains that all forms of communications have increased leading to more bullshit being seen, read and heard. He states that the social expectation for individuals to have and express their opinions on all matters requires more bullshit. Despite a lack of knowledge on a subject matter, for example politics, religion or art, there is an expectation to participate in the conversation and provide an opinion. This opinion is likely to be bullshit at times as it is not based on fact and research. The opinion is motivated by a disregard of the truth with a desire to appear knowledgeable or adequately opinionated. Frankfurt acknowledges that bullshitting may not always be intentional but believes that ultimately it is performed with a disregard and carelessness of the truth. Frankfurt argues that this rise in bullshit is dangerous as it accepts and enables a growing disregard of the truth.

Reception and criticisms 
The responses to Frankfurt's work have varied greatly. Since the publication it has been discussed, adapted, praised and criticized. It has received a positive reception by many academics, is considered remarkable by some, and its popularity amongst the public is evident with its status as a best seller for many weeks. His work has also received criticisms. One of the main criticisms has been that the work is overly simplistic and too narrow: that the book does not acknowledge the many dynamic factors involved in communication, or the dynamic nature of truth. This criticism also explains that the work is limited in its analysis of other motives and forms of bullshit aside from one stemming from a lack of concern for the truth.  One critic notes that the book does not mention, or dismisses, the audience's ability to detect bullshit: that Frankfurt's explanation of bullshit presents a narrative where bullshit goes unnoticed or is easily excusable by its audience. Another critic points to the book's failure to rewrite the original essay to include an acknowledgement or discussion of criticism and accounting for any of the new developments and ideas within psychology and philosophy for the publication of his book.

Despite all these criticisms, as previously mentioned, the work is popular and has received a positive reception. Anthropologist and anarchist David Graeber refers to Frankfurt's text in his 2018 book Bullshit Jobs.

See also
 Truthiness
 Post-truth politics
 Rhetoric
 "On the Decay of the Art of Lying" by Mark Twain

Bibliography
 
  (hardback),  (paperback).

References

Further reading
 
 
 Verbatim preprint archived here: 
 

1986 essays
2005 non-fiction books
2007 non-fiction books
Deception
Philosophy essays
Works originally published in American magazines
Works originally published in literary magazines